Formartin is a rural locality in the Toowoomba Region, Queensland, Australia. In the  Formartin had a population of 95 people.

Geography 
The locality is partly bounded to the north and north-east by Oakey Creek. The creek is a tributary of the Condamine River and part of the Murray-Darling basin.

The land use is crop growing with irrigation in use in the north and east of the locality, taking advantage of the creek.

History

Formartin State School opened on 4 October 1948 and officially closed on 9 December 1988. The school was at 1538 Jondaryan St Ruth Road.

In the  Formartin had a population of 95 people.

Economy 
There are a number of homesteads in the locality, including:

 Avalyn
 Avondale
 Bandawing
 Baroona
 Brigadoon
 Cameron Downs
 Cardwell
 Coolooli
 Dennis Downs
 Double Eight
 Ellerslie
 Formartin
 Kaen
 Kantara
 Nunkeri
 Struanville
 The Three Mile
 Wanganui
 Wyeera

Education 
There are no schools in Formartin. The nearest primary schools are Bowenville State School in neighboring Bowenville to the north-east, Jondaryan State School in neighboring Jondaryan to the east, and Dalby South State School in Dalby to the north-west. The nearest secondary schools are Cecil Plains State School (to Year 9) in Cecil Plains to the south-west, Dalby State High School (to Year 12) in Dalby to the north-west, and Oakey State High School (to Year 12) in Oakey to the east.

References 

Toowoomba Region
Localities in Queensland